Woman in the Moon is a 1928 German science fiction silent film

Woman in the Moon may also refer to:

 The Woman in the Moon, an Elizabethan era stage play
 Woman in the Moon (album), a 1994 album of Chely Wright
 The Woman in the Moon a Barbra Streisand song from the 1976 album and film A Star is Born
 Woman in the Moon (1988 film), a romance film starring Greta Scacchi

See also
 Girl in the Moon
 Man in the Moon (disambiguation)